Kloosterman is a Dutch surname. Notable people with the surname include:

Hendrik Kloosterman (1900–1968), Dutch mathematician
Kloosterman sum
Karin Kloosterman, Canadian entrepreneur, biologist, and journalist
Maarten Kloosterman (born 1942), Dutch Olympic rower

See also
Klostermann

Dutch-language surnames